Munin Mahanta is an Indian communist politician. He represented Marigaon constituency in the Assam Legislative Assembly from 1991 to 2001. He is the Secretary of Communist Party of India Assam State Council. He is also a member of the National Executive of Communist Party of India.

References

Living people
Communist Party of India politicians from Assam
People from Morigaon district
Assam MLAs 1991–1996
Assam MLAs 1996–2001
Year of birth missing (living people)